Calisto  is a butterfly of the family Nymphalidae. It is endemic to Cuba, where it is known from the Sierra Maestra. The species inhabits evergreen and rainforests at altitudes between 800 and 1,500 metres. It is also found in cloud forest above 1,500 metres, and at the cloud scrub around Pico Turquino.

The length of the forewings is 19–25 mm. Adults have been observed feeding on flowers of Bourreria laevis, Palicourea alpina, Pavonia fruticosa, Mikania micrantha and Stachyterpheta cayenensis.

The larvae feed on Ichnanthus mayarensis. They eat the entire shell after hatching and feed at night remaining inactive during the day in lower parts of the plant.

Gallery

References

Calisto (butterfly)
Butterflies of Cuba
Endemic fauna of Cuba
Butterflies described in 1935